Target: International Journal of Translation Studies is a triannual peer-reviewed academic journal covering translation studies. It was established in 1989 by the translation scholars Gideon Toury and José Lambert and is published by John Benjamins.

Abstracting and indexing
This journal is abstracted and indexed in:

According to the Journal Citation Reports, the journal has a 2019 impact factor of 0.605.

References

External links

English-language journals
Biannual journals
Translation journals
Publications established in 1999
John Benjamins academic journals